Abu Ftaira District, also spelled Abu Futaira (Arabic: أبو فطيرة, Standard Arabic: ʾAbū Fuṭayra, Gulf Arabic: Ubu Fṭēra) is an area in Mubarak Al-Kabeer Governorate in Kuwait. It is located approximately 20 kilometres (≈ 12.5 miles) away from Kuwait City.

Districts of Mubarak Al-Kabeer Governorate